Phos armillatus is a species of sea snail, a marine gastropod mollusk in the family Nassariidae, the true whelks.

References

 Fraussen K. & Poppe G.T. (2005) Revision of Phos and Antillophos (Buccinidae) from the Central Philippines. Visaya 1(5): 76-115.

External links
 Galindo, L. A.; Puillandre, N.; Utge, J.; Lozouet, P.; Bouchet, P. (2016). The phylogeny and systematics of the Nassariidae revisited (Gastropoda, Buccinoidea). Molecular Phylogenetics and Evolution. 99: 337-353

Nassariidae
Gastropods described in 2005